Beauty Remains is a 2005 Chinese-American drama film directed by Ann Hu, starring Zhou Xun, Vivian Wu and Wang Zhiwen.

Cast
 Zhou Xun as Fei Zhang
 Vivian Wu as Ying Li
 Wang Zhiwen as Huang
 Lisa Lu as Woman Gambler
  as Bai
 Shen Chang as Xiao Tian

Reception
Matt Zoller Seitz of The New York Times wrote that Kevan's cinematography "contributes to the sense that these hot-blooded characters are frozen by family obligations, social status and the changes unfolding beyond their bedroom walls." Len Klady of Screen Daily wrote that "The specificity of the setting instils a potent dramatic context but ultimately the universality of the emotional terrain is so rich and textured that borders blur and a vibrant heart survives that should provide this international co-production with ample global access." Frank Lovece of Film Journal International wrote that while the ending is "inexplicable", the film's "tapestry and matrix of confused emotions is as breathtaking as the period fashions and as breathless as, well, Breathless."

Elizabeth Weitzman of the New York Daily News rated the film 2 stars and called it "overwrought" but "beautifully atmospheric". Robert Koehler of Variety called the film "unappealing" and "stiff". Aaron Hillis of The Village Voice wrote that the film "plays like the work of a fifth-generation Chinese hack faking a lavish Hollywood saga on an indie budget".

References

External links
 
 

Chinese drama films
American drama films
2005 drama films